Siekbach may refer to:

Siekbach (Werre), a river of North Rhine-Westphalia, Germany, tributary of the Werre
 Siekbach, a river of Germany, tributary of the Exter
 Siekbach, a river of Germany, tributary of the Haferbach
 Siekbach, a river of Germany, tributary of the Oetternbach